Mohammad Musa is a two star military admiral of Bangladesh Navy. He is the incumbent Vice Chancellor of Bangabandhu Sheikh Mujibur Rahman Maritime University. Prior to joining here, he served as the Chairman of Mongla Port Authority. Prior to this appointment, he was Commander of Khulna Naval Area.

Education 
Musa joined Bangladesh Naval Academy on 27 January 1985 with 15th BMA Long Course. After one year of training in Bangladesh Military and Naval Academy, he is the first officer who has undergone Officer's Basic Training at Royal Malaysian Navy. On 1 July 1987, he was commissioned in the Executive branch. In his Academic Credential, he has four master's degrees in War Studies, English Literature, International Security & Strategic Studies and Business Administration respectively. He completed MA in "International Security and Strategy" from Kings College, London. He has completed his M Phil from Bangladesh University of Professionals in 2015. In early 2021, the admiral has completed PhD in "Maritime Awareness: Bangladesh Perspective" from Jahangirnagar University.
Musa is an alumnus of Sylhet Cadet College. 

Musa represented Bangladesh in the State Party meeting in the United Nations in 2013. He attended Senior Executive Decision-Making Programme at Institute for Security Governance in California in 2019. Recently, he attended 12th Regional Sea Power Symposium in Italy and delivered lecture on 'Shaping of Navies in the Blue century. His interviews were published in six international defence & security journals. Many of his numerous articles were published in various defence and security journals at home and abroad.

Personal life 
Musa is married to Nishat Rahman and is father of two sons. His elder brother Air Vice Marshal Muhammad Mafidur Rahman is the Chairman of Civil Aviation Authority, Bangladesh.

Military career 
Musa is a Naval Gunnery Specialist Officer and served as instructor in Bangladesh Naval Academy, Chief Instructor of Naval Gunnery and Seamanship School. He has commanded six warships including Patrol Craft, Offshore patrol vessel, Frigates and lastly the flagship, BNS Bangabandhu. His staff appointments range from Staff Officer Plans and Appointment to Naval Secretary.
Musa has served as the Director of four Directorates namely Directorate of Plans, Submarine, Naval Aviation and Signals. He also served as Naval Secretary. He has commanded the biggest naval establishment of Bangladesh Navy, BNS Issa Khan in Chattogram. As Area Commander, he performed the duties of Naval Administrative Authority Dhaka and Commander Khulna Naval Area. On his tenure as Commander Khulna Naval Area, Musa was reported to have rendered humanitarian assistance and support to local administration during COVID-19 pandemic. Musa executed and conducted relief operations during floods and cyclones as well as supporting aid and assistance to local governments as part of Bangladesh Navy's campaign during the COVID 19 pandemic. Outside Navy, Musa has served as Director at Blue Economy Cell of Energy and Mineral Resources Division. He also served as Directing Staff (Navy) Armed Forces War Course at National Defence College. He is also an alumnus of Defence Services Command and Staff College, Mirpur, French Inter Forces War College, Armed Forces War Course, National Defence College, Royal College of Defence Studies (RCDS), UK and King's College, London. He was appointed as vice chancellor of Bangabandhu Sheikh Mujibur Rahman Maritime University by Government of Bangladesh on January, 2023.

References 

Bangladesh Navy personnel
Bangladeshi Navy admirals
Year of birth missing (living people)
Living people
National Defence College (Bangladesh) alumni